Bunker Hill is an unincorporated community in Stoddard County, in the U.S. state of Missouri.

History
The community was once home to Bunker Hill School, now defunct.  The schoolhouse was named after the Battle of Bunker Hill, fought during the Revolutionary War.

References

Unincorporated communities in Stoddard County, Missouri
Unincorporated communities in Missouri